Silent Voice (also known as Silent Voices) is a 2009 French drama film written and directed by Léa Fehner. The film won the Louis Delluc Prize for Best First Film in 2009. The film also received two nominations at the 35th César Awards.

Cast 
 Farida Rahouadj as Zorha
 Reda Kateb as Stéphane
 Pauline Étienne as Laure
 Marc Barbé as Pierre
 Vincent Rottiers as Alexandre
 Julien Lucas as Antoine
 Dinara Droukarova as Elsa
 Michaël Erpelding as François
 Fanny Avram as Femme du parvis 
 Edmonde Franchi as La mère de Stéphane 
 François Fehner as La mère de Laure

Accolades

References

External links 
 

2009 films
2009 drama films
2000s French-language films
French drama films
Louis Delluc Prize winners
Films directed by Léa Fehner
2009 directorial debut films
2000s French films